Pavel Yakovlevich Fuks ((surname sometimes also spelled Fuchs); b. 27 October 1971) is a Ukrainian oligarch who is known for founding a development company, Mos City Group. Fuks has made most of his wealth through business ventures in Russia. Fuks is a Russian and a Ukrainian citizen, but in June 2021, he claimed that he had gone through all the procedures for renouncing his Russian passport.

Fuks was a member of the Supervisory Board of the Babyn Yar Holocaust Memorial Center (BYHMC).

Early life 
Pavel (Pavlo) Fuks was born in October 1971, in Kharkiv, Ukraine. In 1994, he graduated from the Kharkiv State University after studying at its department of economic and social planning. Between 1997 and 2003, Fuks continued his studies at the Plekhanov Russian University of Economics on the faculty of World Economy.

From 1995 to 1999, he was an adviser to the chairman of the board of JSCB Prominvestbank. In 1999–2000, Fuks served as the vice president of CJSC Foreign Economic Corporation.

Career

Career in Russia 
Fuks' career began when he moved to Russia after his graduation.

In 2000, he invested in a oil company called Nefthold LLC, which is linked to Russian politicians and government officials.

In 2002, he became involved in the construction business. Among his first projects was the construction of the shopping center "Kaluzhskii," which has operated since 2001.

In June 2008, he negotiated with Donald Trump about the construction of Trump Tower in Moscow, but was unable to reach an agreement. Bloomberg failed to verify the claim.

In 2010, Pavel Fuks was the largest shareholder of Sovkombank, where he owned a 21.83 percent stake. In March 2015, he sold his shares, which were valued at US$80 million. As per Ministry of Internal Affairs records, he was given a Russian nickname "Naemnik", which means mercenary in English.

In March 2018, the London International Arbitration Court ordered the now defunct MosCityGroup (MCG) to pay $55 million to a division of BTA Bank. In 2009, MCG bought a stake in the Eurasia Tower (Moscow City) from the former owner of BTA Bank, fugitive and former Kazahh banker, Mukhtar Ablyazov. The new owner of the bank, Kenes Rakishev, stated that MCG did not pay the second tranche totaling 30$ million in a deal to buy a 50% stake in the Eurasia construction project. In addition, the BTA Bank spent 4.2£ million on legal fees. According to Rakishev, the lawyers had filed personal claims against Pavel Fuks.

In 2019, an international arrest warrant was issued for the Fuks brothers, who are wanted in Russia and in Kazakhstan for allegedly embezzling millions of dollars from the Moscow-City project.

Career in Ukraine 
In 2017, Fuks hired Rudy Giuliani's law firm to help improve Kharkiv's public image.

In January 2018, the English-language channel Al Jazeera published a 99-page report partly based on information from the nominal director of one of the Cypriot offshore companies associated with Pavel Fuks. The document showed that Pavel Fuks was negotiating the purchase of the Cypriot company, Quickpace Limited, which had assets of $160 million in the accounts controlled by the fourth President of Ukraine Viktor Yanukovych and sanctioned oligarch Serhiy Kurchenko. As a result, in September 2015, Fuks, together with Oleksandr Onyshchenko, acquired the frozen assets of Quickpace Limited for $30 million (in proportions of 33 percent and 67 percent) and a private jet.

Fuks had Russian citizenship, but in June 2021, he indicated that he had renounced it. Fuks claims that in 2017, he had handed over his Russian passport at the consular department of the Russian Embassy in Ukraine.

On July 19, 2022, Fuks won a lawsuit against American lobbyist Yuri Vanetik in the U.S., obliging him to return Fuks $200 thousand and interest due to dispute over Trump inauguration events Fuks wanted to attend. Vanetik said he planned to appeal the ruling.

According to Rolling Stone, Fuks on the eve of Russia's full-scale invasion of Ukraine launched a false flag campaign to justify Russian invasion. According to the publication, Fuks paid local residents of the city of Kharkiv to paint swastikas on the walls of synagogues.

Sanctions
On 1 November 2018, Russian sanctions were imposed against 322 citizens of Ukraine, including Fuks.

In 2019, he was charged in absentia for embezzlement of funds.

On 18 June 2021, the National Security and Defense Council of Ukraine imposed sanctions against Fuks. Fuks announced he would challenge it in court.

Wealth
Pavel Fuks has repeatedly been included in the rating of billionaires of the magazine, Finance. In 2011, he took 150th place in the ranking of Russian billionaires, and a capital estimate of $740 million.

As per Focus, Fuks had a fortune of $270 million and took the 24th position in the 2017 ranking of the 100 richest people in Ukraine.

Philanthropy 
Fuks has regularly aided his native city of Kharkiv, having taken part in the restoration of the Kharkiv regional philharmonic and construction of the Church of the Holy Queen Tamara and a monument to the mythical founder of Kharkiv, cossack Kharko.

He has supported athletes, including giving Ukrainian freestyle skier Oleksandr Abramenko and his mentor and senior coach of the Ukrainian national team, Enver Ablaev, certificates for 50 thousand dollars each for their achievements in Pyeongchang at the XXIII Olympic Winter Games.

In 2020, according to Interfax-Ukraine, Fuks gave financial support to the families of the officers and cadets of the Ivan Kozhedub National Air Force University who were killed or injured in a plane crash near Chuhuiv. He transferred 2.7 million hryvnias to the families, with each family receiving 100,000 hryvnias of material assistance.

In 2022 (during the period of Russia's full-scale invasion of Ukraine) as per Fuks' press service report, the businessman sent more than $8 million to support the Armed Forces of Ukraine, the Territorial Defense Forces, the National Guard of Ukraine and to help the families of the dead and injured Ukrainian military.

Babi Yar Holocaust Memorial Center

Fuks was the co-organizer of the construction of the Babyn Yar Holocaust Memorial Center, which was projected to cost an estimated US$50 to 100 million. According to Fuks, the structure of the memorial will include educational programs, a research center and a museum.

On 19 March 2017, the Supervisory Board of the Memorial Center for the Holocaust "Babi Yar" was established, and included Pavel Fuks, the Mayor of Kyiv Vitali Klitschko and his brother, the professional boxer Wladimir Klitschko. The board also included the shareholders of the consortium "Alfa Group" Mikhail Fridman and German Khan, among others.

Critics of the project, such as Ukrainian Jewish dissident, leader and president of Association of Jewish Communities of Ukraine, Yosyf Zisels, characterized the project as a Russian Trojan Horse. In 2021, after the levying of sanctions by the National Security Council of Ukraine against Pavel Fuks for his role in illegally obtaining licenses for the extraction of minerals from Ukraine, the Babi Yar Supervisory Council announced that he had temporarily left the supervisory board with plans to return if the sanctions get lifted.

Controversy 
Fuks, a well-connected person in Kharkov, was made the Honorary Citizen of Kharkov in 2014 along with Russian politician Alexander Shishkin by Gennady Kernes. As a result, a controversy was created and the following day the honor was revoked.

Awards 
For help in the fight against Russian aggression, he has a number of awards from the Minister of Defense of Ukraine, the Commander-in-Chief of the Armed Forces of Ukraine, units of the Armed Forces of Ukraine, the National Guard of Ukraine, the Territorial Defense Forces and Security Service of Ukraine:
 Insignia of the Ministry of Defense of Ukraine medal "For assistance to the Armed Forces of Ukraine" (order of the Minister of Defense of Ukraine Oleksii Reznikov).
 Honorary badge "For assistance to the army" (order of the Commander-in-Chief of the Armed Forces of Ukraine Valerii Zaluzhnyi).
 Insignia "For cooperation and patriotism" from the commander of a separate special forces unit "Omega" of the National Guard of Ukraine.
 Honorary badge from the commander of the Operational Command West Serhii Lytvynov.
 Badge from the head of the Regional Directorate of the Territorial Defense Forces "East" Oleksandr Zuhravyi.

References

External links
 Official website
 Pavel Yakovlevich Fuks executive profile

1971 births
Businesspeople from Kharkiv
Businesspeople in construction
Ukrainian oligarchs
Ukrainian philanthropists
Ukrainian investors
Ukrainian bankers
Living people
Ukrainian Jews
Ukrainian emigrants to Russia
People who lost Russian citizenship